James Lawrence (16 February 1879 – 21 November 1934) was a Scottish football player and manager. A goalkeeper, he played for Newcastle United between 1904 and 1922.

Career

Playing career
Born in Partick, Lawrence's first club was Partick Athletic, from where he moved to Glasgow Perthshire. Although still connected to Glasgow Perthshire, he played three matches in 1904 for Edinburgh side Hibernian when their regular custodian Harry Rennie was unavailable. He played with Newcastle for eighteen years after joining the Tyneside club in 1904 and still holds the record for making the most appearances for them - 432 league appearances, 496 matches in total.

With Newcastle he won the English Championship in 1905, 1907 and 1909, and the FA Cup in 1910, also playing on the losing side in the finals of 1905, 1906, 1908 and 1911.

In 1911 he also represented the Scottish national team on one occasion, a 1–1 draw with England at Goodison Park in Liverpool in the British Home Championship.

Management
Lawrence showed an aptitude for administration when acting as chairman of The Players' Union in his later days at Newcastle, and after his playing retirement he moved into management. His first appointment was with then Second Division side South Shields (1922–23) before joining Preston North End. He stayed with the Lilywhites until 1925, when he relocated to Germany to manage Karlsruher FV. With this club he won the regional championship of Württemberg/Baden in 1926 and of Baden in 1928, 1929, 1931 and 1932 which qualified the club to participate in the matches for the German football championship.

Lawrence later returned to Scotland and in 1933 was elected chairman of Stranraer. He died while in office a year later.

Personal life
He was thought to have been born in 1885, and used this year in his registration documents with Newcastle United, but sports historian Andy Mitchell found that he was in fact born six years earlier (along with a twin sister); this discovery makes him Newcastle United's oldest ever player.

Honours

Player
Newcastle United
Football League championship: 1904–05, 1906–07, 1908–09
 FA Cup winner: 1910
Runner-up: 1905, 1906, 1908, 1911

Manager
Karlsruher FV
Baden regional championship: 1926, 1928, 1929, 1931, 1932

References

External links
 Toon 1892: Player Profile - Jimmy Lawrence

1879 births
1934 deaths
Scottish footballers
Scotland international footballers
Footballers from Glasgow
People from Partick
Association football goalkeepers
Newcastle United F.C. players
Hibernian F.C. players
Scottish football managers
Scottish expatriate football managers
Gateshead A.F.C. managers
Preston North End F.C. managers
Chairmen and investors of football clubs in Scotland
English Football League managers
Scottish twins
Twin sportspeople
English Football League players
Stranraer F.C.
Glasgow Perthshire F.C. players
Scottish Junior Football Association players
Scotland junior international footballers
Karlsruher FV managers
FA Cup Final players
20th-century Scottish businesspeople
Scottish expatriate sportspeople in Germany
Expatriate football managers in Germany